Gómara is a locality and municipality of the province of Soria, judicial district of Soria, autonomous community of Castile and León, Spain. It is the capital of the comarca of Campo de Gómara, and its population is of 397. The municipality includes the village Torralba de Arciel.

References

Municipalities in the Province of Soria